Socket 4, presented in 1993, was the first CPU socket designed for the early  P5 Pentium microprocessors. Socket 4 was the only 5-volt socket for the Pentium. Socket 4 does support a special Pentium OverDrive, which allows running at 120 MHz (for the 60 MHz Pentium) or 133 MHz (for the 66 MHz Pentium).

Socket 4 was superseded by the 3.3-volt-powered Socket 5 in 1994.

See also
 List of Intel microprocessors

References

Socket 004